The Pine River is a small river in South East Queensland, Australia.

The river is formed by the confluence of the North Pine and the South Pine rivers at Lawnton, continuing into Bramble Bay. The Brisway map reference is 440 D10.

Location and features
The Pine River carries the city border between the Moreton Bay Region and City of Brisbane along its middle (continuing up the South Pine River). The northern shoreline follows Pine Rivers suburbs of Murrumba Downs and Griffin, while the southern shoreline follows Brisbane suburbs of Bald Hills and Brighton. The river descends  over its  course. The Pine River and Hays Inlet wetland is significant because of its value to wildlife, especially migratory waders. The Pine River is classified as being 'extensively modified'.

The Pine Rivers Shire draws its name from the Pine, the North Pine and the South Pine rivers.

Flora species

Mangrove Species:
River mangrove (Aegiceras corniculatum),
Large-fruited orange mangrove (Bruguiera gymnorhiza),
Yellow mangrove (Ceriops tagal),
Spotted mangrove (Rhizophora stylosa),
Milky mangrove (Exoecaria agallocha),
Black mangrove (Lumnitzera racemosa).
Eucalypt and mixed woodland species:
Moreton Bay ash (Corymbia tessellaris),
Grey ironbark (Eucalyptus paniculata),
Swamp she-oak (Casuarina glauca),
White bottlebrush (Callistemon salignus),
Swamp paperbark (M. quinquenervia),
Broad-leaved leopard tree (Flindersia collina), 
Cotton tree (Hibiscus tiliaceus).

The predominant land uses in the catchment area are native bush, grazing, rural residential and urban.

Human uses
Water Supply: North Pine Dam North Pine Dam (Lake Samsonvale) is located on the North Pine River.

Recreational fishing: Pine river is a popular waterway for recreational fishing. Total estimated recreational catch for Pine River in 1997 was 1,509,755 fish (2.71% of Qld total) from an estimated 141,092 fishing trips (1.31% of Qld total). Estimated catch by top five species included; Whiting 351,799, Bream 230,598, Winter Whiting 203,028, Diver Whiting 190,131, Snapper (Squire) 127,298. (Data for 1999)

Pine River is also used for other water based recreation including water skiing and the use of personal water craft.

See also

References

External links
 Pine Rivers Shire Waterways
 Pine Rivers catchment and estuary ecosystem health monitoring program

Rivers of Queensland
Geography of South East Queensland
Moreton Bay